The 2021 Castle Point Borough Council election took place on 6 May 2021 to elect members of Castle Point Borough Council in England.

Results summary

Ward results

Appleton

Boyce

Boyce (by-election)

Canvey Island Central

Canvey Island East

Canvey Island North

Canvey Island South

Canvey Island Winter Gardens

Cedar Hall

St. George's

St. George's (by-election)

St. James

St. Mary's

St. Peter's

Victoria

By-elections

References

2021
Castle Point